The Aldwych farces were a series of twelve stage farces presented at the Aldwych Theatre, London, nearly continuously from 1923 to 1933. All but three of them were written by Ben Travers. They incorporate and develop British low comedy styles, combined with clever word-play. The plays were presented by the actor-manager Tom Walls and starred Walls and Ralph Lynn, supported by a regular company that included Robertson Hare, Mary Brough, Winifred Shotter, Ethel Coleridge, and Gordon James.

The farces were so popular that touring companies were sent to present them in the British provinces.  Most of the Aldwych farces were adapted for film in the 1930s, starring the original stage casts as far as possible. The plays were later seen in television versions, and some enjoyed revivals.

History
Leslie Henson and Tom Walls co-produced the farce Tons of Money in 1922 at the Shaftesbury Theatre. This was a great popular success, running for nearly two years, and they collaborated again, moving to the Aldwych Theatre. Walls secured a cheap, long-term lease on the theatre, which had fallen so far out of fashion with playgoers that it had been used as a YMCA hostel during the First World War.

The first in the Aldwych farce series was It Pays to Advertise, which ran for nearly 600 performances. Meanwhile, Ben Travers' first play, The Dippers, based on his 1920 novel of the same name, was produced and directed by Sir Charles Hawtrey. It became a success on tour from 1921 and in another London theatre in 1922. Lawrence Grossmith had acquired the rights to Travers' farce A Cuckoo in the Nest and sold them to Walls.

It took Travers some time to establish a satisfactory working relationship with Walls, whom he found difficult as an actor-manager, and also distressingly unprepared as an actor. In the early days, he also had reservations about the other star of the company, Ralph Lynn, who initially ad-libbed too much for the author's taste. Travers built on each play, and the characterisations in the earlier plays, in writing the next farce for the company; and even Walls' calls to the stage manager for lines became a popular part of opening nights at the Aldwych.

The Aldwych farces also featured a regular team of supporting actors: Robertson Hare as a figure of put-upon respectability; Mary Brough in eccentric old lady roles; Ethel Coleridge as the severe voice of authority; the saturnine Gordon James as the "heavy"; and first Yvonne Arnaud, then Winifred Shotter, as the sprightly young female lead. The plays generally revolved around a series of preposterous incidents involving a misunderstanding, borrowed clothes and lost trousers, involving the worldly Walls character, the innocent yet cheeky Lynn, the hapless Hare, the beefy, domineering Brough, the lean, domineering Coleridge, and the pretty and slightly spicy Shotter, all played with earnest seriousness. The scripts incorporated and developed British low comedy styles, particularly "silly-asses, henpecked husbands, battleaxe mothers-in-law and lots of innocent misunderstandings."

The farces proved popular, and touring casts were regularly sent to the provinces. Some touring players, such as William Daunt (1893–1938) who played the Ralph Lynn roles, made considerable personal successes in the 1920s playing Aldwych farces in the provinces. Lynn's younger brother Hastings Lynn, played his brother's roles in successful productions in Australia and New Zealand. Among the up-and-coming performers who appeared in Aldwych farces before becoming famous were Roger Livesey, Margot Grahame, and Norma Varden.

After five years of extraordinary success, Walls' business partnership with Henson ended in September 1927 during the run of Thark, and from October, the Aldwych farces were presented by the firm of Tom Walls and Reginald Highley Ltd. By 1930, Walls was losing interest in the theatre, turning his attention to the cinema. He did not appear in the last three of the twelve Aldwych farces, which had disappointing runs. The last of them, A Bit of a Test in 1933, ran for 142 performances, compared with runs of more than 400 performances for some of the earlier productions.

In 1952, three years after Walls's death, Lynn and Hare starred at the Aldwych in a new Travers farce, Wild Horses. It ran from 6 November 1952 to 11 April 1953. In the 1950s and early 1960s, a similar hit series of farces began at the Whitehall Theatre and came to be known as Whitehall farces.

On stage
The following table shows the opening and closing dates, and the number of performances given, in the original productions of the Aldwych farces.  All were written by Ben Travers, except where otherwise shown:

In film

Most of the farces, as well as some other works by Travers, were filmed during the 1930s. The films featured many of the actors who had starred in the plays; Walls directed all the films except for Just My Luck and Marry the Girl. The films introduced the farces to cinema audiences and were produced by a number of film distributors including the British and Dominions Film Corporation, Gaumont-British Picture Corporation, and Gainsborough Pictures.

Films of the original Aldwych farces are:
Rookery Nook (1930; released in the US as One Embarrassing Night)
Plunder (1931)
A Night Like This (1932, with W. P. Lipscomb)
Thark (1932)
A Cuckoo in the Nest (1933, with A. R. Rawlinson)
Turkey Time (1933)
Just My Luck (1933; filmed version of Fifty-Fifty)
A Cup of Kindness (1934)
Dirty Work (1934)
Marry the Girl (1935)

The two Aldwych farces not filmed by members of the company were It Pays to Advertise and A Bit of a Test. The first of these plays was an updated and Anglicised adaptation of an American play of 1914; a version of the original play was filmed in the US in 1931, starring Norman Foster, Carole Lombard, and Richard "Skeets" Gallagher.

Other filmed farces by Travers, with one or more of the Aldwych stars, are:
The Chance of a Night Time (1931; based on the Travers play The Dippers)
Fighting Stock (1935; based on the Travers play of the same name)
Foreign Affaires (1935; an original screenplay by Travers)
Pot Luck (1936; loosely based on the Travers play, A Night Like This)
Second Best Bed (1938; based on a Travers story)
Banana Ridge (1941, with Walter C. Mycroft and Lesley Storm, from the Travers play of the same name)

Other film comedies of the period directed by Walls, with many of the Aldwych stars, are:
On Approval (1930; based on the play On Approval by Frederick Lonsdale)
Tons of Money (1930 remake)

Revivals and broadcasts
Of the twelve Aldwych farces, Rookery Nook has been regularly revived. It is a staple of repertory companies from Dundee to Wolverhampton, Colchester and Oxford, and has been revived in four productions in the West End.  Plunder has had several revivals:  at the Bristol Old Vic in 1973, at the National Theatre in 1976, and at the Savoy Theatre in 1994.  A Cuckoo in the Nest was revived by the English Stage Company at the Royal Court in 1964. As at 2013, the only other of the twelve to have been revived in the West End is Thark, in 1965 and 1989.

The BBC has televised productions of several of the farces. In the 1950s, Brian Rix's Whitehall company broadcast a series of performances. In 1970, BBC presented adaptations of six of the Aldwych series (and another Travers farce, She Follows Me About) with Arthur Lowe and Richard Briers in the Walls and Lynn roles.

Notes

References
 
 
  
 
 

 
British comedy
Comedy genres
Comedy plays
Performing arts
Theatre in the United Kingdom